Lorenzo Bernucci (born 15 September 1979 in Sarzana) is an Italian former professional road bicycle racer.

Career
He started his professional career with Landbouwkrediet–Colnago in 2002 before joining Fassa Bortolo in 2005. Upon Fassa's demise at the end of 2005, Bernucci secured a contract with T-Mobile. Bernucci was fired from T-Mobile in September 2007 after testing positive for Sibutramine. Bernucci admitted to taking the weight control drug and said he had been taking it for four years, unaware it had been added to the list of banned substances in 2006. T-Mobile judged he had broken the internal code of conduct so fire him immediately.

In February 2011, Bernucci was banned from cycling for five years. After his house was raided in 2010, prohibited substances were found and he was banned for 'the use or attempted use by an athlete of a prohibited substance or method, as well as the possession of prohibited substances'. Several members of his family were also banned for either three or four years due to their involvement.

Major results

1999
 3rd Gran Premio di Poggiana
2000
 1st Gran Premio della Liberazione
 3rd  Road race, UCI Under-23 Road World Championships
 4th Trofeo Alcide Degasperi
2001
 2nd Gran Premio di Poggiana
 3rd Paris–Roubaix Espoirs
 3rd Trofeo Piva
 5th Liège–Bastogne–Liège U23
 5th Trofeo Alcide Degasperi
 7th GP Palio del Recioto
2002
 3rd Overall Étoile de Bessèges
 10th Giro del Piemonte
2003
 5th Trofeo Città di Castelfidardo
 8th Overall Étoile de Bessèges
2004
 2nd Trofeo Laigueglia
 6th Overall Tour du Poitou Charentes et de la Vienne
 9th Giro delle Colline del Chianti
2005
 1st Stage 6 Tour de France
 2nd Tre Valli Varesine
 3rd Züri-Metzgete
 3rd GP Fred Mengoni
 4th Overall Tour de Luxembourg
 5th GP Città di Camaiore
 5th Trofeo Città di Castelfidardo
 8th Coppa Sabatini
 8th Coppa Ugo Agostoni
2006
 2nd Overall Sachsen-Tour
 2nd Trofeo Magaluf-Palmanova
2007
 6th Trofeo Sóller
 7th Trofeo Pollença
 8th Overall Danmark Rundt
2008
 6th Firenze–Pistoia
2009
 1st Stage 1 (TTT) Settimana Ciclistica Lombarda
 4th Overall Giro della Provincia di Grosseto
 8th Overall Giro di Sardegna
2010
 8th Overall Giro della Provincia di Reggio Calabria

Grand Tour general classification results timeline

See also
 List of sportspeople sanctioned for doping offences
 List of doping cases in cycling

References

External links

1979 births
Living people
People from Sarzana
Italian male cyclists
Italian Tour de France stage winners
Doping cases in cycling
Italian sportspeople in doping cases
Cyclists from Liguria
Sportspeople from the Province of La Spezia